Io e mio figlio – Nuove storie per il commissario Vivaldi is an Italian television series.

Cast
 Lando Buzzanca as Federico Vivaldi
 Giovanni Scifoni as Stefano Vivaldi
 Sergio Sivori as Saverio Stucchi
 Caterina Vertova as Laura
 Luigi Maria Burruano as Salvatore Girlando
 Alberto Molinari as Giulio Maria Zorzi
 Giuseppe Schisano as Damien Crescenzi
 Alessandra Celi as Monica Rovati
 Renato Marotta as Mazzola
 Elena Bouryka as Eva Ferrer
 Daniela Poggi as magistrate Flavia Conti
 Anna Orso as Maria Gradoli
 Simona Caparrini as Cristina Vallauro
 Paolo Romio as Yuri Tibaldi
 Morgana Forcella as Valentina
 Alberto Gimignani as Nicola Pinto
 Ornella Bonaccorsi as Dori Tancredi
 Andrea Meo as Enrico
 Andrea Montuschi as Pineschi
 Nicola Nocella as Guidolin
 Cristiana Lionello as Daria Volonghi
 Anna Ammirati as Claudia Porpora
 Gianni Verdesca

See also
List of Italian television series

External links
 

Italian television series
2010 Italian television series debuts
2010 Italian television series endings
2010s Italian television series
RAI original programming